Live at the Deaf Club is a live album released by the Dead Kennedys in 2004 and had a limited edition re-release 2013 in the UK on Let Them Eat Vinyl.  The actual performance took place at the San Francisco Deaf Club on March 3, 1979.

The performance was unique in that this was the last time their rhythm guitarist 6025 performed with them. It also includes original drummer Ted, later replaced in February 1981 by D.H. Peligro. Also, the song "Gaslight" and their covers of "Back in the U.S.S.R." and "Have I the Right" are not found on any other DK album (The Deaf Club recordings of "Short Songs" and "Straight A's" are featured on the compilation album Give Me Convenience Or Give Me Death and the hard-to-find Can You Hear Me? Music From The Deaf Club along with "Police Truck"). "Back in Rhodesia" is an early version of "When Ya Get Drafted" with a different chorus than the final version. "Kill the Poor" is also a "disco" version minus the introduction.

The album has drawn criticism from former lead singer Jello Biafra, who lost control of the Dead Kennedys name after being found guilty of civil fraud and malice for withholding full royalties from his bandmates for several years. However, several critics have given the album good reviews, for example PopMatters and Punknews.org.

Track listing

Personnel
 Jello Biafra – lead vocals
 East Bay Ray – lead guitar, producer
 6025 – rhythm guitar
 Klaus Flouride – bass, backing vocals
 Ted – drums
 Sue Brisk – photography
 Jim Alcivar – engineer
 Justin Phelps – mixer
 John Cuniberti – mastering

References

Dead Kennedys albums
2004 live albums
Manifesto Records albums